The term "National Treasure" has been used in Japan to denote cultural properties since 1897, although the definition and the criteria have changed since the introduction of the term. The written materials in the list adhere to the current definition, and have been designated National Treasures according to the Law for the Protection of Cultural Properties that came into effect on June 9, 1951. The items are selected by the Ministry of Education, Culture, Sports, Science and Technology based on their "especially high historical or artistic value". The list presents 57 entries from the 7th century Tang Dynasty to the Kamakura period with more than half originating in China. The total number of items is higher, however, since groups of related objects have been joined as single entries. The list contains works that have been originally compiled in China by Chinese authors. A large proportion of these works are Chinese classics.

Written language was introduced to Japan around 400 AD in the form of Chinese books written in Classical Chinese. Japanese interest in Chinese writings and culture gradually increased towards the end of the 6th century when Japanese rulers sent missions to the mainland for cultural studies and to bring back books. During circa 300 years in the Sui and Tang Dynasties, a large number of Chinese books were brought to Japan. By the 8th century, Chinese works were customarily copied at Japanese libraries to satisfy the demand for education of the male aristocracy. Until the early 17th century, copying in Japan was largely by hand. However, Chinese printed editions of the Song Dynasty were imported following an increased trading activity at the start of the Kamakura period (after 1192). The designated manuscripts are either transcriptions of the original works produced in China or in Japan or are Chinese printed editions. The Chinese manuscripts, both handwritten and printed editions, were imported to Japan at the time. The designated treasures are housed in temples, museums, libraries, shrines, universities and in private collections.

The objects in this list represent about one fourth of the 232 National Treasures in the category "writings". They are complemented by 70 Japanese book National Treasures of the List of National Treasures of Japan (writings: Japanese books) and 105 other written National Treasures of the List of National Treasures of Japan (writings: others).

Statistics

Usage
The table's columns (except for Remarks and Image) are sortable by pressing the arrows symbols. The following gives an overview of what is included in the table and how the sorting works.
Name: the name as registered in the Database of National Cultural Properties
Authors: name of the author(s)
Remarks: information about the type of document and its content
Date: period and year; The column entries sort by year. If only a period is known, they sort by the start year of that period.
Format: principal type, technique and dimensions; The column entries sort by the main type: scroll (includes handscrolls and letters), books (includes albums, ordinary bound books and books bound by fukuro-toji) and other (includes hanging scrolls)
Present location: "temple/museum/shrine-name town-name prefecture-name"; The column entries sort as "prefecture-name town-name".
Image: picture of the manuscript or of a characteristic document in a group of manuscripts

Treasures

Chinese manuscripts
Japan's first experience with books and written language came from books written in Classical Chinese in China, brought to Japan from the Korean kingdoms, at least by the 5th and probably by the end of the 4th century. According to legend, the scholar Wani came to Japan in 406 and brought with him the Confucian Analects and Thousand Character Classic. These were followed, in later years, by the Five Classics (Book of Odes, Book of History, Book of Rites, Book of Changes and the Spring and Autumn Annals), which, by the 6th century, became well known among the Japanese literary elite. The Seventeen-article constitution, compiled in 604 by Prince Shōtoku, has quotations that allow the identification of 18 Chinese books known to have existed in Japan at the time: Odes, Rites, Classic of Filial Piety, Analects, Chronicle of Zuo, the Han Chronicles (Book of Han and Book of the Later Han), Wen Xuan anthology, Zhuangzi and other classical Chinese writings.

The distribution of Chinese books to Japan reached its first peak in the Sui and Tang dynasties. During this period books were brought to Japan through two sources: people, who were mostly literate, moving from the continent; and by official missions sent out by the Japanese court. Four envoys to Sui China were dispatched under Prince Shōtoku, but this number quickly increased during the Tang dynasty, which saw 16 envoys of circa 200 to 600 people, each sent to study Chinese culture and to acquire Chinese books. One of the most well-known missions was that by Kibi Makibi who left Japan in 717, spent 17 years in China and returned with books on various subjects. Examples of works imported during this period include the first Chinese pharmacopoeia (Xinxiu Bencao), compiled and imported in the same year (713), and Tang poetry by Li Bai, Wang Wei and Bai Juyi. Towards the end of the Tang Dynasty, at the end of the 9th century, about half of the canon of Chinese literature was present in Japan, including texts of all major Tang poets. The Book Catalogue in Japan, compiled between 876 and 884 by the aristocrat and scholar Fujiwara no Sukeyo, showed entries for 1,568 Chinese books, located in Japan, in classics, history, philosophy and anthologies. Due to the cessation of missions to China in the late 9th century, relatively few Chinese books were imported through the mid and late Heian period.

Some books such as the Yupian or the Meihōki were lost early in China, because of the persecution against Buddhism or for other reasons. The titles survived, however, because of the large volume of books previously imported to Japan, which were then subsequently re-exported to China. Today, some of the oldest extant manuscripts of Chinese books dating to the Tang Dynasty are located in Japan. Few of the early imported manuscripts have survived. Some of those that survived are listed as National Treasures below. Twenty one Chinese book National Treasures exist that were created in China and subsequently imported to Japan. Of these, 20 date to the Tang Dynasty and one to the Southern Song. The designated items are of various type: six treasures are manuscripts of the Five Classics of Confucianism and associated commentaries, four are poetry and prose anthologies of Chinese poets, calligraphers and Emperor Huizong of Song, four are dictionaries, five are anecdote collections, one is a music score and one a traced copy of a letter.

Japanese manuscripts
In Japan, until the Heian period, the language of government and ritual was Classical Chinese in which was composed decrees, codes, commands, communications and certificates. Consequently, Chinese books were essential for the education of the (male) aristocracy, and beginning readers studied books such as the Mencius or the Thousand Character Classic. Towards the end of the 7th century, to prepare selected sons of the nobility for a government career, Emperor Tenji established the Daigaku-ryō ("Academy"). At first the curriculum consisted mainly of Confucian Classics and Chinese history. Chinese learning thrived in the 9th century, and the academy's curriculum saw a rise in literary composition based on the Chinese books Wen Xuan, Records of the Grand Historian and the Books of Han and Later Han. Unlike in China at the time, Classical Confucian studies, especially the historical and political side of Confucianism, were still held in high esteem in the Heian period with commentaries used for study dating to the Han Dynasty. In fact, one of the Japanese emperor's prescribed activities was listening to lectures on the Chinese classics, histories, and poetic anthologies.

Chinese books had reached Japan since circa 400 AD and had been imported in large quantities through a number of missions during the Sui and Tang Dynasties. Official missions ended after 894, but books continued to reach Japan in the mid to late Heian period through commercial exchange or via priests travelling to China. Imported Chinese books were copied at Japanese libraries, but unlike sutra copying little is known about the actual copying process of Chinese secular works in Japan. The Japanese aristocracy and clergy sponsored the transcription of religious and government texts on a large scale by the Nara period.

The first state library was the Zusho-ryō ("Bureau of Archives") established by the Taihō Code from 701. Attached to the Daigaku-ryō, it oversaw the custody (collection and preservation) and transmission of Buddhist and Confucian books from the Nara period, until its destruction by fire in the mid-Heian period (11th century). Collection depended largely on the copying of texts held elsewhere. In addition to the Zusho-ryō, books were also copied at imperial palace libraries, private libraries of aristocrats, temple libraries and at libraries of organs of the state. In the Heian period, the majority of works held in libraries (both those produced in China and those copied in Japan) consisted of Chinese works and scholarly collections were dominated by Chinese secular works. At the end of the Heian period, the great fire of Kyoto in 1177, and the burning of temples by the Taira in 1180, destroyed a large part of the literary heritage. During the Kamakura period, the warrior class founded new libraries such as the Kanazawa Bunko.

There are 23 Chinese book National Treasures that are transcriptions produced in Japan. Of these four date to the Nara period, 17 to the Heian period and two to the Kamakura period. The designated items are of various type: four are historical chronicles, four are poetry collections, three are dictionaries or reference books, two are medical or botanical books and one is a book on politics.

Song printed editions
Printing had been known in Japan from at least the 8th century, when a large number of dharani known as Hyakumantō Darani were printed from 764 to 770 and placed in miniature wooden pagodas. These count among the oldest extant printed texts in East Asia and were likely made by woodblock printing. The Hyakumantō Darani were ritual Buddhist printings, neither meant for distribution nor for reading. This practice of devotional printing continued into the Heian period. The first practical printing in Japan can be dated to the 11th century and is associated with sutra commentaries and doctrinal works for which handcopying did not entail religious merit. Despite the increasing popularity of printing, many texts, particularly Japanese literature, continued to be copied by hand on manuscript scrolls. Commercial printing did not become common until the early 17th century.

Printing in China initially had a similar development, starting with the printing of religious scriptures, prayers and popularly useful texts such as almanacs or calendars which were produced for local use by temples. By the Five Dynasties, the government realized the opportunities of printing political and ideological texts such as the Classics. The ensuing Song Dynasty saw great advancements in art, religion and philosophy with scholarly activity greatly facilitated by printed books. Consequently, the Chinese publishing industry took off during the Song Dynasty, several hundred years before the same happened in Japan. Enhanced by the Song interest of foreign trade and the maritime activity of the Taira, the book exchange between China and Japan saw a second peak after the Sui and Tang Dynasties starting in 1192. Japanese visitors to Song China returned with a large number of printed books, on a variety of subjects such as history, philosophy, Buddhism, Confucianism, literature, medicine and geography, causing a revival of pure scholarship, which had been sidelined during the earlier obsession with poetry in the Heian period courtier society.

The supply of imported printed editions of Chinese texts was insufficient to meet the demand and by the time of the Taira supremacy collections of Chinese books had become status symbols among the upper class of Japan. Books were collected and formed the nuclei of many new libraries, in particular those associated with Zen temples of Kyoto and Kamakura or those founded by samurai families of the Kantō region. These libraries became centers of learning and to a great extent stimulated the varied and energetic scholarly activities of the coming medieval age. The most important of these new libraries in the Kamakura period was the Kanazawa Bunko, established in 1275 by Hōjō Sanetoki. Eclectic in scope, it had a huge collection of books embracing the literary culture of all of East Asia, including a great number of Song editions of Chinese works. The collection was dispersed at the end of the 16th century and partially transferred to Edo by Tokugawa Ieyasu. Librarians of Kanazawa Bunko used an ownership seal, making it possible to trace existing copies back to that library. During the Muromachi period Uesugi Norizane revived in 1432 the Ashikaga Gakko library that came to house a bulk of mainly Confucian texts and exegetical works.

Thirteen sets of Song printed books have been designated as National Treasures. Many of them have been handed down in feudal era Japanese clans and were stored at libraries such as Kanazawa Bunko, Ashikaga Gakko or at monasteries such as the one of Tōfuku-ji. They cover mainly Chinese Classics such as books and commentaries on Records of the Grand Historian, the Book of Han, the Book of Later Han, Classic of History, Book of Rites, Book of Songs or the Book of Changes. Two are encyclopedias.

See also
Nara Research Institute for Cultural Properties
Tokyo Research Institute for Cultural Properties
Independent Administrative Institution National Museum

Notes

References

Bibliography

Books, Chinese
National Treasures of Japan (writings: Chinese books)
Chinese literature
Japanese poetry